Divine Right may refer to:

 The Divine right of kings, the doctrine that a monarch derives his or her power directly from God
 "The Divine Right of Kings" (poem), an 1845 poem attributed to Edgar Allan Poe
 Divine Right (game), a 1979 fantasy wargame
 Divine Right: The Adventures of Max Faraday, a comic book series, 1997–1999
 Divine Right, a 1989 anthology in the Merovingen Nights series 
 "Divine Right", a song on the 2004 album Hi-Fi High Lights Down Low by Lodger (Finnish band)
 The Divine Right, a 1996 play by Peter Whelan
 "Divine Right", a 1954 short story by J. T. McIntosh

See also
 Divine Right's Trip, a 1972 novel by Gurney Norman
 By Divine Right, a Canadian indie rock band 
 Divine law